The Evolution Series is a line of diesel locomotives built by GE Transportation Systems (now owned by Wabtec), initially designed to meet the U.S. EPA's Tier 2 locomotive emissions standards that took effect in 2005. The first pre-production units were built in 2003. Evolution Series locomotives are equipped with either AC or DC traction motors, depending on the customer's preference.  All are powered by the GE GEVO engine.

The Evolution Series was named as one of the "10 Locomotives That Changed Railroading" by Trains Magazine and was the only locomotive series introduced after 1972 to be included in that list.

The Evolution Series locomotives are some of the best-selling and most successful freight locomotives in United States history.

Models 
Currently, six different Evolution Series models have been produced for the North American market. They are all six axle locomotives and have the wheel arrangement C-C (AAR classification) or Co′Co′ (UIC classification), except for the ES44C4 which has an A1A-A1A wheel arrangement and the meter-gauge version developed for the Brazilian network ES43BBi which is B-B-B-B.

ES40DC (2004-2008) 

The ES40DC (Evolution Series, 4,000 hp, DC traction) replaced the Dash 9-40CW model in the General Electric catalogue and, like the former model, was delivered exclusively to Norfolk Southern Railway. However, high-horsepower demand on Norfolk Southern made a mandatory repowering of several ES40DC engines into their former ES44DC power.

ES44DC (2005-2010) 

The ES44DC (Evolution Series, 4,400 hp, DC traction) replaced the Dash 9-44CW model in the General Electric catalogue. Primary users are BNSF Railway, CSX Transportation, and Canadian National Railway. Pilbara Iron in Australia ordered a lengthened, international version designated ES44DCi. The extra length is used for a larger radiator to increase cooling capacity in the Australian outback.

ES44AC (2003-2019) 

The ES44AC (Evolution Series, 4,400 hp, AC traction) replaced the AC4400CW model in the General Electric catalogue. These locomotives have been ordered by every Class I railroad in North America: Union Pacific Railroad (who refers to these locomotives as the C45ACCTE), BNSF Railway, CSX Transportation, Norfolk Southern Railway, Kansas City Southern Railway, Kansas City Southern de Mexico, Ferromex, Canadian Pacific Railway, and Canadian National Railway.

ES44C4 (2009-2015) 
The ES44C4 (Evolution Series, 4,400 hp, C to denote 3 axles per truck, 4 traction motors) was introduced in 2009. While similar to the ES44AC, the ES44C4 has two traction motors per truck, instead of the conventional three such as on the ES44AC. No ES44C4s with DC traction were built.  The center axle of each truck is unpowered, giving an A1A-A1A wheel arrangement. BNSF Railway is the launch customer for this model, ordering an initial batch of 25 units numbered 6600–6624. The ES44C4 was initially only built for BNSF. The 4200s and units 7921-7999 are certified as Tier 4 Credit units, while the others are Tier 2 or Tier 3. On 30 January 2014 Florida East Coast Railway announced that they would buy 24 ES44C4s, to be numbered 800–823, for heavy haul service and intermodal traffic. All were delivered by the end of 2014, in order to beat the EPA's deadline on exhaust-emissions standards for new-built Tier 3 locomotives.

A feature of these units is a variable traction control system in their computer systems. One of the differences between an ES44AC and an ES44C4 is the air cylinders and linkages on the truck sideframes of the ES44C4; these are part of the traction control system. Every time a variation in grade, traction, or wheel slip occurs, the computer adjusts the pressure in these cylinders to maintain sufficient adhesion, by varying the weight on the drive axles.

ES44DCi/ES44ACi

The ES44DCi (Evolution Series, 4400 horsepower, DC traction, international version) was built for the Rio Tinto railway in Australia. The ES44ACi was built for the Roy Hill and Rio Tinto Group.

Rio Tinto's units can be remotely driven, meaning nobody has to be in the cab as they can be controlled from a control center.

The ES44ACi/DCi is essentially an ES44AC/DC in a GE AC6000CW's body, with the radiator at the end protruding out over the rear deck in the same way the AC6000CW does. The locomotive's large radiator allows it to handle the Australian outback's extreme temperatures.

Roy Hill has ordered 21 ES44ACi locomotives, and is currently in possession of all 21 locomotives (numbered 1001 "Ginny"-1021). Rio Tinto ordered 100 ES44DCi locomotives and has all 100 (numbered 8100–8199) and 21 ES44ACi locomotives (numbered 9100–9120) and more are on order.

Ferromex also acquired 50 ES44ACi. As the construction of these locomotives was subsequent to the new environmental laws of the US, GE cataloged them only as ES44ACi, although in the external technical specifications of the locomotives say ES44AC). These locomotives can no longer reenter the US operating.

ET44AC/ET44C4 (2012-Present)

The ET44AC (Evolution Series Tier 4, 4,400 hp, AC traction) replaces the ES44AC model.  These locomotives have been ordered by most of the Class I railroads in North America, including Union Pacific, CSX Transportation, Norfolk Southern and Canadian National Railway. BNSF Railway will be receiving similar ET44C4 locomotives, which have no traction motor on the middle axle of each truck. CSX designates their ET44ACs as ET44AH, due to their locomotives being heavy-ballasted.

TE33A

The TE33A is an export 1520 mm gauge locomotive in the GE Evolution Series.

Identifying features 
The Evolution Series locomotives are visually similar to the AC4400CW, although small differences are evident.  The most noticeable difference is the radiator section at the rear of the locomotive is larger to accommodate the GEVO's air-to-air intercoolers. As with the AC6000CW, the radiators project beyond the end of the hood. On the ES44ACi and ES44DCi models, the radiator extends in the same way as the AC6000CW, protruding out over the rear deck. For the other Evolution Series locomotives, the radiator does not protrude completely over the rear deck, but rather sits nearly flush with the rear of the engine hood. Unlike previous GE locomotives, the grills under the radiator are at two different angles. The increase in radiator size is due to the necessity for greater cooling capacity in the locomotive in order to reduce emissions.  The other major difference between the Evolution Series and earlier models is the vents below the radiators, which are larger than those on previous GE locomotives. Also, all Evolution Series units have air conditioners mounted below the cab on the conductor's side.

Operators

Licensed production

Australia
In 2002, GE and UGL launched the Evolution Series locomotive, and in 2009, continued their partnership for another 10 years for UGL to distribute and sell GE locomotives in Australia.

India

In November 2015, it was announced Indian Railways and GE would engage in a 11-year joint venture in which GE would hold a majority stake of 74%, to provide a mix of 1,000 diesel locomotives of type ES43ACmi which are 4,500 horsepower and type ES57ACi which are 6,000 horsepower each. Indian Railways designated these 1,676 mm (broad gauge) locomotives as the WDG-4G class and WDG-6G class respectively. General Electric has invested ₹2,052 crore (US$305 million) for its construction. In the $2.6 Billion deal, Indian Railways would purchase 1,000 goods locomotives a year for ten years beginning in 2017; the locomotives would be modified versions of the GE Evolution series. Diesel Locomotive Factory, Marhowrah was built by GE for the manufacture of the locomotives.

South Africa

Transnet Engineering in South Africa has a license to manufacture 233   ES40ACi locomotives for Transnet Freight Rail, with core components including GEVO-12 engines supplied from the United States.

The first six of these Class 44-000 locomotives were built in Erie, Pennsylvania, in April and July 2015. In October 2015, the first of the 227 South African-built locomotives was nearing completion at Transnet Engineering's Koedoespoort shops in Pretoria.

See also
EMD SD70 series, a similarly powerful locomotive produced by EMD in response to GE's predecessor of the Evolution Series, the Dash 9 Series.

References

Notes

Bibliography

External links 

 GE Transportation Systems. Evolution Series locomotive.
 NorthEast Rails. GE AC4400-6000 Diesel Railroad Locomotives.  Retrieved on 23 February 2005.
 GE Evolution Locomotives. Published by Voyageur Press 2007 ""

Evolution Series
C-C locomotives
Diesel-electric locomotives of the United States
A1A-A1A locomotives
EPA Tier 2-compliant locomotives of the United States
Railway locomotives introduced in 2003
Standard gauge locomotives of the United States
Standard gauge locomotives of Canada
Standard gauge locomotives of Mexico
Standard gauge locomotives of China
Standard gauge locomotives of Australia
Standard gauge locomotives of Egypt
5 ft gauge locomotives
5 ft 3 in gauge locomotives
Standard gauge locomotives of Colombia
Diesel-electric locomotives of Canada
Diesel-electric locomotives of Mexico
Diesel-electric locomotives of China
Diesel-electric locomotives of Australia
Diesel-electric locomotives of Egypt
Diesel-electric locomotives of Colombia